Mike Gottlieb (born October 24, 1956) is a former American college baseball coach, serving as head coach of the Towson Tigers baseball program from 1988 to 2017. He was named to that position prior to the start of the 1988 season.

Playing career
Gottlieb played two seasons for Nassau Community College before transferring to Towson. He played first base for the Tigers and graduated in 1980.

Coaching career
After his playing career ended, Gottlieb earned a position as an Assistant Coach with the Tigers. He served for seven seasons until head coach Billy Hunter was promoted to Athletic Director. Gottlieb was named head coach immediately. Since being named head coach, the Tigers have played in four conferences, winning a single regular season title and three conference tournament championships. Gottlieb has led Towson to three NCAA Tournament appearance, won an America East Coach of the Year award, and placed two players in Major League Baseball.

During the 2013 NCAA Division I baseball season, Towson announced that they would discontinue baseball and soccer. The players reacted angrily by blacking out the Towson name on their jerseys and exploring transfer options. As the players rallied around their coach, fourth seeded Towson raced through the 2013 Colonial Athletic Association baseball tournament to claim the title, then earned a first round win in the NCAA tournament before finishing third in the Regional. Amid controversy and national attention, funding was secured to keep the baseball program through at least the 2015 season.

Head coaching record
This table shows Gottlieb's record as a head coach at the Division I level.

See also
 List of current NCAA Division I baseball coaches

References

Living people
1956 births
Baseball first basemen
Nassau Lions baseball players
Towson Tigers baseball coaches
Towson Tigers baseball players
People from Lynbrook, New York